Eleriin Haas (born 4 July 1992 in Pärnu) is an Estonian athlete specialising in the high jump. She represented her country at the 2015 World Championships without qualifying for the final.

Her personal bests in the event are 1.94 metres outdoors (Zürich 2014) and 1.90 metres indoors (Pärnu 2012).

She has a son Kristofer, born in 2010.

Competition record

References

1992 births
Living people
Estonian female high jumpers
World Athletics Championships athletes for Estonia
Sportspeople from Pärnu
Estonian expatriates in Finland